Athletes from the Islamic Republic of Iran competed at the 1992 Summer Olympics in Barcelona, Spain.

Competitors

Medal summary

Medal table

Note: Demonstration sports indicated in italics.

Medalists

Results by event

Athletics 

Men

Boxing 

Men

Cycling

Road 

Men

Track 

Men

Table tennis 

Men

Weightlifting 

Men

Wrestling 

Men's freestyle

Men's Greco-Roman

Demonstration sports

Taekwondo 

 
Men

References

External links
International Olympic Committee results database

Nations at the 1992 Summer Olympics
1992
Olympics